The 2011 Kano State gubernatorial election occurred on April 26, 2011. PDP candidate Rabiu Kwankwaso won the election, defeating ANPP Salihu Sagir Takai and 12 other candidates.

Rabiu Kwankwaso emerged PDP's candidate in the primary election, scoring 1,555 votes and defeating Habibu Idris Shuaibu who scored 89 votes,  Mohammed Adamu Bello who scored 71 votes and Kabiru Kama Kasa who scored 0 vote.

Magaji Abdullahi was ACN candidate, Lawal Jafaru Isa was CPC candidate. Salihu Sagir Takai was ANPP candidate.

Results
Rabiu Kwankwaso from the PDP won the election defeating other 13 candidates.

The total number of registered voters in the state was 5,190,382, total votes cast was 2,477,112, valid votes was 2,409,692 and rejected votes was 67,420.

Rabiu Kwankwaso, (PDP) – 1,108,345
Salihu Sagir Takai, ANPP – 1,048,317
Lawal Jafaru Isa, CPC – 175,143
Magaji Abdullahi, ACN – 54,015
Others – 23,872

References 

Kano State gubernatorial elections
Kano State gubernatorial election
Kano State gubernatorial election